The Spain national under-17 football team represents Spain in international football at this age level and is controlled by Royal Spanish Football Federation, the governing body for football in Spain.

Considered one of the strongest national team in under 17 level, Spain has participated in 9 out of 14 World Cup tournaments. Spain hold the record of playing the most finals without ever winning the tournament, having finished as runners-up on four occasions.

Competitive record

FIFA U-17 World Cup record

UEFA European U-17 Championship record

*Denotes draws include knockout matches decided on penalty kicks.
Gold background color indicates first-place finish. Silver background color indicates second-place finish. Bronze background color indicates third-place finish.

Honours
 FIFA U-17 World Cup 
 Runners-up (4): 1991, 2003, 2007, 2017
 Third place (2): 1997, 2009
 UEFA U-17/16 Championship (U-17 since 2002)
 Winners (9): 1986, 1988, 1991, 1997, 1999, 2001, 2007, 2008, 2017
 Runners-up (6): 1992, 1995, 2003, 2004, 2010, 2016
 Third place (3): 1985, 1998, 2006

Individual awards
In addition to team victories, Spanish players have won individual awards at UEFA European Under-17 Football Championship.

In addition to team victories, Spanish players have won individual awards at FIFA World Cup Under-17 Football Championship.

Player records

Top appearances 

Note: Club(s) represents the permanent clubs during the player's time in the Under-17s.

Top goalscorers 

Note: Club(s) represents the permanent clubs during the player's time in the Under-17s.

Current squad
 The following players were selected for the 2022 UEFA European Under-17 Championship matches between 16 May and 1 June 2022.

Former squads

2017 FIFA U-17 World Championship squads - Spain
2009 FIFA U-17 World Championship squads - Spain
2007 FIFA U-17 World Championship squads - Spain
2003 FIFA U-17 World Championship squads - Spain
2001 FIFA U-17 World Championship squads - Spain
1999 FIFA U-17 World Championship squads - Spain
1997 FIFA U-17 World Championship squads - Spain
1995 FIFA U-17 World Championship squads - Spain
1991 FIFA U-17 World Championship squads - Spain

2018 UEFA European Under-17 Championship squads - Spain
2017 UEFA European Under-17 Championship squads - Spain
2016 UEFA European Under-17 Championship squads - Spain
2015 UEFA European Under-17 Championship squads - Spain
2010 UEFA European Under-17 Championship squads - Spain
2009 UEFA European Under-17 Championship squads - Spain
2008 UEFA European Under-17 Championship squads - Spain
2007 UEFA European Under-17 Championship squads - Spain
2006 UEFA European Under-17 Championship squads - Spain
2004 UEFA European Under-17 Championship squads - Spain
2003 UEFA European Under-17 Championship squads - Spain
2002 UEFA European Under-17 Championship squads - Spain

See also
Spain national football team
Spain national under-23 football team
Spain national under-21 football team
Spain national under-20 football team
Spain national under-19 football team
Spain national under-18 football team
Spain national under-16 football team
Spain national under-15 football team
Spain national youth football team

References

External links
siemprecantera 
Spain under-17 at Soccer-Spain
Tournament archive at fifa.com
Tournament archive at uefa.com
UEFA U-17 European Championship at rsssf

 

European national under-17 association football teams
Football